Jean Delcour, or Del Cour (1627, in Hamoir – 1707), was a Baroque sculptor from Liège, in present-day Belgium.

Biography

At the age of 15 he became a sculpture pupil in Liege of the monk Arnold Henrard. After this training he traveled to Rome and became a pupil of Gian Lorenzo Bernini. He was also influenced by Ercole Ferrata. In 1661 he returned to Liege where he started a workshop on the street Soeurs-de-Hasques. He sculpted wood, marble, and ivory for the wealthy leaders of the Prince-Bishopric of Liège.

An altar from his hand in Cararra marble is now in the Virga Jesse Basilica that was originally commissioned for Herkenrode Abbey by the abbess there, Anna Catharina de Lamboy. He also made the mausoleum van Allamont in the Saint Bavo Cathedral in Ghent.

His only pupil, Jean Hans, never left his service and stayed with him until he died.

References

1627 births
1707 deaths
Artists from the Spanish Netherlands
17th-century Flemish sculptors
People from Hamoir